Empire Blanda was a cargo ship that Lithgows Ltd, Port Glasgow built in 1919 as Nile. It was sold to a Yugoslavian company in 1930 and renamed Sokol in 1933, serving until 1939 when it was sold to a Panamanian company and renamed Rio Grande. In 1940, the Ministry of War Transport (MoWT) requisitioned Nile, which was renamed Empire Blanda. On 19 February 1941  torpedoed Nile, sinking it.

Description
The ship was  a  cargo ship. It was built by Lithgows Ltd, Port Glasgow, as yard number 715. The ship was launched as Nile on 30 September 1919 and completed in November. It was manufactured by J G Kincaird Ltd, Greenock. The ship could make .

Career
Nile was owned by the Nile Steamship Co Ltd and operated under the management of Glen & Co Ltd. Its port of registry was Glasgow. In 1930, Nile was sold to Jugoslovenska Plovidba DD, Susak. It was renamed Sokol in 1933.

In 1939, Sokol was sold to Compagnia Panamena de Vapores Ltda and renamed Rio Grande. It was operated under the management of T & N Coumantaros Ltd, Greece. In June 1940, Rio Grande sailed from Bermuda to Halifax, Nova Scotia to join Convoy HX 51, which arrived at Liverpool on 2 July. It was carrying a cargo of lumber and sulphur. On arrival, Rio Grande was requisitioned by the MoWT and renamed Empire Blanda. It was operated under the management of the Larrinaga Steamship Co Ltd. Its port of registry was London.

Convoy HX 107 departed Halifax on 3 February 1941 and was to arrive at Liverpool on 28 February. Empire Blanda was carrying a cargo of steel, bound for Glasgow. Those lost on Empire Blanda are commemorated at the Tower Hill Memorial, London.

Official Numbers and Code Letters

Official Numbers were a forerunner to IMO Numbers. Nile and Empire Blanda had the UK Official Number 141931.

Nile used the Code Letters KOWS from 1930. Rio Grande used the Code Letters HPKQ Empire Blanda used the Code Letters GLXW.

References

1919 ships
Ships built on the River Clyde
Steamships of the United Kingdom
Merchant ships of the United Kingdom
Steamships of Yugoslavia
Cargo ships of Yugoslavia
Steamships of Panama
World War II merchant ships of Panama
Empire ships
Ministry of War Transport ships
Ships sunk by German submarines in World War II
World War II shipwrecks in the Atlantic Ocean
Maritime incidents in February 1941
Ships lost with all hands